The government of Ontario is the body responsible for the administration of the Canadian province of Ontario. A constitutional monarchy, the Crown—represented in the province by the lieutenant governor—is the corporation sole, assuming distinct roles: the executive, as the Crown-in-Council; the legislature, as the Crown-in-Parliament; and the courts, as the Crown-on-the-Bench. The functions of the government are exercised on behalf of three institutions—the Executive Council; the Provincial Parliament (Legislative Assembly); and the judiciary, respectively. Its powers and structure are partly set out in the Constitution Act, 1867.

The term Government of Ontario refers specifically to the executive—political ministers of the Crown (the Cabinet/Executive Council), appointed on the advice of the premier, and the non-partisan Ontario Public Service (whom the Executive Council directs), who staff ministries and agencies to deliver government policies, programs, and services—which corporately brands itself as the Government of Ontario, or more formally, His Majesty's Government of Ontario.

Owing to the location of the Ontario Legislative Building on the grounds of Queen's Park, the Ontario government is frequently referred to by the metonym "Queen's Park".

The Crown 

, as monarch of Canada is also the King in Right of Ontario. As a Commonwealth realm, the Canadian monarch is shared with 14 other independent countries within the Commonwealth of Nations. Within Canada, the monarch exercises power individually on behalf of the federal government, and the 10 provinces.

Lieutenant Governor 

The powers of the Crown are vested in the monarch and are exercised by the lieutenant governor. The advice of the premier and Executive Council is typically binding; the Constitution Act, 1867 requires executive power to be exercised only "by and with the Advice of the Executive Council".

Powers and function 
The lieutenant governor is appointed by the governor general, on the advice of the prime minister of Canada. Thus, it is typically the lieutenant governor whom the premier and ministers advise, exercising much of the royal prerogative and granting royal assent.

While the advice of the premier and Executive Council is typically binding on the lieutenant governor, there are occasions when the lieutenant governor has refused advice. This usually occurs if the premier does not clearly command the confidence of the elected Legislative Assembly.

Federally, a notable instance occurred in 1926, known as the King-Byng Affair, when Governor General Lord Byng of Vimy refused Prime Minister Mackenzie King's request to dissolve the federal Parliament to call for a general election. More recently, on a provincial level in 2017 following the provincial election in British Columbia, Premier Christy Clark met with Lieutenant Governor Judith Guichon and advised dissolution of the Legislature. Guichon declined the Clark's request. Clark then offered her resignation as Premier, and the leader of the Official Opposition, John Horgan, who was able to command the confidence of the elected Legislature, was invited to form government.

Executive power 

The executive power is vested in the Crown and exercised "in-Council", meaning on the advice of the Executive Council; conventionally, this is the Cabinet, which is chaired by the premier and comprises ministers of the Crown. The term Government of Ontario, or more formally,  Majesty's Government refers to the activities of the Lieutenant Governor-in-Council. The day-to-day operation and activities of the Government of Ontario are performed by the provincial departments and agencies, staffed by the non-partisan Ontario Public Service and directed by the elected government.

Premier 
The premier of Ontario is the first minister of the Crown. The premier acts as the head of government for the province, chairs and selects the membership of the Cabinet, and advises the Crown on the exercise of executive power and much of the royal prerogative. As premiers hold office by virtue of their ability to command the confidence of the elected Legislative Assembly, they typically sit as a MPP and lead the largest party or a coalition in the Assembly. Once sworn in, the premier holds office until their resignation or removal by the lieutenant governor after either a motion of no confidence or defeat in a general election.

In Canada, the Cabinet of provincial and territorial governments are known as an Executive Council.

The premier of Ontario is Doug Ford of the Progressive Conservatives since the 2018 election; the 26th since Confederation.

Cabinet membership

Crown corporations

Legislative power 

The unicameral 124-member Legislative Assembly of Ontario, and the Crown-in-Parliament (represented by the lieutenant governor) comprise the Provincial Parliament of Ontario. As government power is vested in the Crown, the role of the lieutenant governor is to grant royal assent on behalf of the monarch to legislation passed by the Legislative Assembly. The Crown does not participate in the legislative process save for signifying approval to a bill passed by the Assembly.

Membership 
Officeholders, known as members of Provincial Parliament (MPPs) are elected using the first-past-the-post system.

Government 
The legislature plays a role in the election of governments, as the premier and Cabinet hold office by virtue of commanding the body's confidence. Per the tenets of responsible government, Cabinet ministers are almost always elected MPPs, and account to the Legislative Assembly.

Opposition 
The second largest party of parliamentary caucus is known as the Official Opposition, who typically appoint MPPs as critics to shadow ministers, and scrutinize the work of the government.

Judiciary

See also
Association of Management, Administrative and Professional Crown Employees of Ontario
Cabinet of Ontario
Ontario Public Service Employees Union
Politics of Ontario
Caucus services bureau

References

External links